Christopher Malseed (born 29 July 1986) is an Irish footballer. Having signed for Scottish football team Stirling Albion in 2006, the midfielder has also played for Finn Harps and Letterkenny Rovers.

References

External links
 
 Finn Harps
 Stirling Albion

1986 births
Living people
Association football midfielders
Expatriate footballers in Scotland
Finn Harps F.C. players
Letterkenny Rovers F.C. players
League of Ireland players
People from Letterkenny
Republic of Ireland association footballers
Scottish Premier League players
Association footballers from County Donegal
Stirling Albion F.C. players